Daniela Atehortua Hoyos (born 30 March 1999) is a Colombian professional racing cyclist, who currently rides for UCI Women's Continental Team . She rode in the women's road race event at the 2020 UCI Road World Championships.

References

External links
 

1999 births
Living people
Colombian female cyclists
Sportspeople from Antioquia Department
20th-century Colombian women
21st-century Colombian women